5-MeO-MiPT is a psychedelic and hallucinogenic drug, used by some as an entheogen.  It has structural and pharmacodynamic properties similar to the drugs 5-MeO-DiPT, DiPT, and MiPT. It is commonly used as a "substitute" for 5-MeO-DiPT because of the very similar structure and effects.

Chemistry
5-MeO-MiPT is in a class of compounds commonly known as tryptamines, and is the N-methyl-N-isopropyl homologue of the psychedelic, 5-MeO-DMT.  The full name of the chemical is 5-methoxy-N-methyl-N-isopropyltryptamine.

5-MeO-MiPT causes the ehrlich reagent to turn purple then fade to faint blue. It causes the marquis reagent to go yellow through to black.

Effects
This is an analogue of the more popular drug 5-MeO-DiPT (nicknamed "foxy methoxy") and has the nickname "moxy". Some users report the tactile effects of 5-MeO-DiPT without some of the unwanted side effects.  At higher doses it becomes much more psychedelic sometimes being compared to 5-MeO-DMT. But at doses of 4-10 milligrams users find 5-MeO-MiPT to be a very euphoric and tactile chemical. Its energetic effects can be very strong at high doses, increasing normal heart rate considerably. Sounds can be amplified in perception to a point where synesthetic effects ("touching or/and tasting sounds") occur.

Pharmacodynamics

Dosage
Based on many anecdotal reports, dosages can be classified as follows:

Pharmacology
The mechanism that produces the hallucinogenic and entheogenic effects of 5-MeO-MiPT is thought to result primarily from 5-HT2A receptor agonism, although additional mechanisms of action such as inhibition of MAO may be involved also. While 5-MeO-MiPT binds most strongly to 5-HT1A receptors, it also shows fairly strong binding affinity to the SERT and NET, thereby acting as a moderately potent serotonin-norepinephrine reuptake inhibitor. These mechanisms may help explain why there are many anecdotal reports of anti-depressant and anxiolytic effects from modest doses of this compound. For example, SNRIs such as venlafaxine are commonly prescribed to treat depression, and the 5-HT1A agonist buspirone is prescribed primarily for treatment of anxiety.

Reagent Results 
Exposing compounds to the reagents gives a colour change which is indicative of the compound under test. The following test results are from protestkit.

Dangers
The toxicity of 5-MeO-MiPT is not known. There is no known documentation of death attributed to the use of 5-MeO-MiPT alone.

Legal status

Canada
5-MeO-MiPT is not scheduled in Canada.

China

As of October 2015 5-MeO-MiPT is a controlled substance in China.

Luxembourg 
In Luxembourg, 5-MeO-MiPT is not cited in the list of prohibited substances. Therefore, it is still a legal substance.

United Kingdom
5-MeO-MiPT is a Class A drug in the United Kingdom as are most ethers of ring-hydroxy tryptamines.

United States
5-MeO-MiPT is unscheduled at the federal level in the United States, but it could be considered an analog of 5-MeO-DiPT, in which case purchase, sale, or possession with intent to consume could be prosecuted under the Federal Analog Act.

Florida
"5-Methoxy-N-methyl-N-isopropyltryptamine" is a Schedule I controlled substance in the state of Florida making it illegal to buy, sell, or possess in the state of Florida.

See also
 MIPT
 5-MeO-DMT
 5-MeO-DiPT
 5-MeO-MET

References

External links
 5-MeO-MiPT Entry in TIHKAL
 5-MeO-MIPT Entry in TiHKAL • info

Designer drugs
Psychedelic tryptamines
Methoxy compounds